Curtis Walker is a British actor, writer and stand-up comedian. He starred in BBC comedy shows Paramount City, CBBC sitcom Kerching!, The Real McCoy and Blouse and Skirt. Walker was the pre-show warm up act for the London 2012 Olympic Opening Ceremony.

References

External links

Living people
British male television actors
Black British male actors
Black British male comedians
British stand-up comedians
English people of Senegalese descent
1961 births
Comedians from London